The 2012 South American Cross Country Championships took place on March 4, 2012.  The races were held at the Escuela de Equitación del Ejército (Army’s Equestrian School) in Lima, Perú.  A detailed report of the event was given for the IAAF.

Complete results and results for junior and youth competitions were published.

Medallists

Race results

Senior men's race (12 km)

 

Note: Athletes in parentheses did not score for the team result.

Junior (U20) men's race (8 km)

Note: Athletes in parentheses did not score for the team result.

Youth (U18) men's race (4 km)

Note: Athletes in parentheses did not score for the team result.

Senior women's race (8 km)

Note: Athletes in parentheses did not score for the team result.

Junior (U20) women's race (6 km)

Note: Athletes in parentheses did not score for the team result.

Youth (U18) women's race (3 km)

Note: Athletes in parentheses did not score for the team result.

Medal table (unofficial)

Note: Totals include both individual and team medals, with medals in the team competition counting as one medal.

Participation
According to an unofficial count, 85 athletes from 9 countries participated.

 (8)
 (2)
 (23)
 (7)
 (10)
 Panamá (1)
 Perú (25)
 (2)
 (7)

See also
 2012 in athletics (track and field)

References

South American Cross Country Championships
South American Cross Country Championships
South American Cross Country Championships
South American Cross Country Championships
Cross country running in Peru
March 2012 sports events in South America